Rasno is a village in the municipality of Prijepolje in the Serbian district of Zlatibor. According to the 2002 census, the village has a population of 410 people.

References

Populated places in Zlatibor District